Tupperville is a community in the Canadian province of Nova Scotia, located in  Annapolis County. Before it became known as Tupperville it was once Girouard Village, home of many generations of the Girouard family from 1690 to 1755 starting with Jacques Girouard (b-1648 d-1703) and his wife Marguerite Gautrot Girouard. Jacques was the eldest son of François Girouard and Jeanne Aucoin Girouard. The Girouard's built a number of homes and worked the land which also once belonged to Charles D'Aulnay, Governor of Acadie from 1636 to 1650. Tupperville was named after Canada's sixth Prime Minister Sir Charles Tupper who was said to frequent the area.

References

Communities in Annapolis County, Nova Scotia